The Old Ballroom is a 1925 German silent drama film directed by Wolfgang Neff and starring Carl Auen, Olga Tschechowa, and Sybill Morel. It was released in two parts, both of which premiered on the same day in Berlin.

The film sets were designed by the art director Franz Seemann.

Cast
In alphabetical order

References

Bibliography

External links

1925 films
1925 drama films
German drama films
Films of the Weimar Republic
Films directed by Wolfgang Neff
German silent feature films
German black-and-white films
Silent drama films
1920s German films